Andrzejewski (feminine Andrzejewska; plural Andrzejewscy) is a Polish surname derived from the given name Andrew. In the early 1990s there were 26,917 people in Poland with the name.  Notable people with this name include:

 Andrzej Andrzejewski (1961–2008), Brigadier General of the Polish Air Force
 Bohdan Andrzejewski (born 1942), Polish fencer
 B. W. Andrzejewski (1922–1994), Polish-British Somalist
 Jadwiga Andrzejewska (1915–1977), Polish actress
 Jerzy Andrzejewski (1909–1983), Polish writer
 Leonard Andrzejewski (1924–1997), Polish actor
 Pat Benatar (born Patricia Mae Andrzejewski; 1953), American singer
 Tadeusz Andrzejewski (1923–1961), Polish archeologist
 Stanisław Andrzejewski (1919–2007), Polish-British sociologist
 Stanley Andrews (born Stanley Martin Andrzejewski; 1891–1969), American actor

See also
 Piotr Anderszewski and Dorota Anderszewska, Polish brother and sister, pianist and violinist

References

Polish-language surnames